Braeside is an area of Aberdeen, Scotland.

References

Areas of Aberdeen